1932 in sports describes the year's events in world sport.

Alpine skiing
FIS Alpine World Ski Championships

2nd FIS Alpine World Ski Championships are held at Cortina d'Ampezzo, Italy.  The events are a downhill, a slalom and a combined race in both the men's and women's categories.  The winners are:
 Men's Downhill – Gustav Lantschner (Austria)
 Men's Slalom – Friedl Däuber (Germany)
 Men's Combined – Otto Furrer (Switzerland)
 Women's Downhill – Paula Wiesinger (Italy)
 Women's Slalom – Rösli Streiff (Switzerland)
 Women's Combined – Rösli Streiff (Switzerland)

American football
 1932 NFL Playoff Game: the Chicago Bears won 9–0 over the Portsmouth Spartans (This was the first National Football League championship game)
 Rose Bowl (1931 season):
 The USC Trojans won 21–12 over the Tulane Green Wave to win the college football national championship
 Michigan Wolverines – college football national championship shared with USC Trojans
 Washington Redskins founded in Boston; start off as the Boston Braves

Association football
England
 The Football League – Everton 56 points, Arsenal 54, Sheffield Wednesday 50, Huddersfield Town 48, Aston Villa 46, West Bromwich Albion 46
 FA Cup final – Newcastle United 2–1 Arsenal at Empire Stadium, Wembley, London
France
 A professional football league Division Nationale, first official game held on September 11, as predecessor for Ligue 1.
Germany
 National Championship – Bayern Munich 2–0 Eintracht Frankfurt at Nuremberg
Spain
 La Liga won by Real Madrid
Italy
 Serie A won by Juventus

Athletics
Men's 100 metres
 Eddie Tolan (USA) breaks the world record by running a time of 10.3 seconds

Australian rules football
VFL Premiership
 Richmond wins the 36th VFL Premiership, defeating  Carlton 13.14 (92) to 12.11 (83) in the 1932 VFL Grand Final
Brownlow Medal
 The annual Brownlow Medal is awarded to Haydn Bunton senior (Fitzroy)
South Australian National Football League
 1 October: Sturt won its fourth SA(N)FL premiership, beating North Adelaide 16.14 (110) to 10.9 (69)
 Magarey Medal won by Max Pontifex (West Torrens)
Western Australian National Football League
 8 October: West Perth win their fifth WA(N)FL premiership but first since 1905, beating East Perth 18.9 (117) to 10.14 (74)
 Sandover Medal won by Keith Hough (Claremont-Cottesloe)

Bandy
Sweden
 Championship final – IF Karlstad-Göta 3–2 Västerås SK

Baseball
World Series
 28 September to 2 October — New York Yankees defeats Chicago Cubs to win the 1932 World Series by 4 games to 0.  In Game 3, Babe Ruth hits his famous "called shot" home run, which is followed immediately by a Lou Gehrig solo home run.
Events
 Brooklyn's major league baseball team, known informally until now as the “Superbas”, the “Robins”, or the “Trolley Dodgers”, officially selects the name Brooklyn Dodgers

Basketball
Events
 The 1932 South American Basketball Championship in Santiago, Chile, is won by Uruguay.

Bobsleigh
Olympic Games (Men's Competition)

Two bobsleigh events are held at the 1932 Winter Olympics in Lake Placid : 
 2-man bob – gold: USA I; silver: Switzerland II; bronze: USA II
 4-man bob – gold: USA I; silver: USA II; bronze: Germany I

Boxing
Events
 Jack Sharkey wins the World Heavyweight Championship, defeating Max Schmeling on points over 15 rounds.
Lineal world champions
 World Heavyweight Championship – Max Schmeling → Jack Sharkey
 World Light Heavyweight Championship – Maxie Rosenbloom
 World Middleweight Championship – vacant
 World Welterweight Championship – Lou Brouillard → Jackie Fields
 World Lightweight Championship – Tony Canzoneri
 World Featherweight Championship – Bat Battalino → vacant
 World Bantamweight Championship – Panama Al Brown
 World Flyweight Championship – vacant

Canadian football
Grey Cup
 20th Grey Cup in the Canadian Football League – Hamilton Tigers 25–6 Regina Roughriders

Cricket
Events
 India plays its first Test match, against England. England wins by 159 runs.
England
 County Championship – Yorkshire
 Minor Counties Championship – Buckinghamshire
 Most runs – Herbert Sutcliffe 3,336 @ 74.13 (HS 313)
 Most wickets – Tich Freeman 253 @ 16.39 (BB 9–61)
 Wisden Cricketers of the Year – Ewart Astill, Freddie Brown, Alec Kennedy, C. K. Nayudu, Bill Voce 
Australia
 Sheffield Shield – New South Wales
 Most runs – Don Bradman 1,403 @ 116.91 (HS 299*)
 Most wickets – Clarrie Grimmett 77 @ 19.93 (BB 7–83)
India
 Bombay Quadrangular – not contested
New Zealand
 Plunket Shield – Wellington
South Africa
 Currie Cup – Western Province
West Indies
 Inter-Colonial Tournament – Trinidad and Tobago

Curling
1932 Winter Olympics
 Curling is a demonstration event at the 1932 Winter Olympic Games between four teams from Canada and four from the United States, Canada winning by 12 games to 4

Cycling
Tour de France
 André Leducq wins the 26th Tour de France
Events
 Antonio Pesenti wins the 1932 Giro d'Italia

Field hockey
1932 Summer Olympics (Men)
 Gold Medal – India
 Silver Medal – Japan
 Bronze Medal – USA

Figure skating
World Figure Skating Championships
 World Men's Champion – Karl Schäfer (Austria)
 World Women's Champion – Sonja Henie (Norway)
 World Pairs Champions – Andreé Joly-Brunet and Pierre Brunet (France)
1932 Winter Olympics
 Men's individual – Karl Schäfer (Austria)
 Women's individual – Sonja Henie (Norway)
 Pairs – Andreé Joly-Brunet and Pierre Brunet (France)

Golf
Major tournaments
 British Open – Gene Sarazen
 U.S. Open – Gene Sarazen
 PGA Championship – Olin Dutra
Other tournaments
 British Amateur – John de Forest
 U.S. Amateur – Ross Somerville
 Women's Western Open – Jane Weiller

Harness racing
USA
 Hambletonian – The Marchioness
 Kentucky Futurity – The Marchioness

Horse racing
England
 Champion Hurdle – Insurance
 Cheltenham Gold Cup – Golden Miller (first of five successive wins)
 Grand National – Forbra
 1,000 Guineas Stakes – Kandy
 2,000 Guineas Stakes – Orwell
 The Derby – April the Fifth
 The Oaks – Udaipur
 St. Leger Stakes – Firdaussi
Australia
 Melbourne Cup – Peter Pan III
Canada
 King's Plate – Queensway
France
 Prix de l'Arc de Triomphe – Motrico
Ireland
 Irish Grand National – Copper Court 
 Irish Derby Stakes – Dastur
USA
 Kentucky Derby – Burgoo King
 Preakness Stakes – Burgoo King
 Belmont Stakes – Faireno

Ice hockey
Stanley Cup
 5–9 April — Toronto Maple Leafs defeat the New York Rangers in the 1932 Stanley Cup Finals by 3 games to 0
Ice Hockey World Championships
 Gold Medal – Canada
 Silver Medal – USA
 Bronze Medal – Germany
1932 Winter Olympics
 Gold Medal – Canada
 Silver Medal – USA
 Bronze Medal – Germany

Motorsport

Nordic skiing
Olympic Games (Men's Competition)
 Cross-country skiing (18 km) – gold medal: Sven Utterström (Sweden)
 Cross-country skiing (50 km) – gold medal: Veli Saarinen (Finland)
 Ski jumping – gold medal: Birger Ruud (Norway)
 Nordic combined – gold medal: Johan Grøttumsbråten (Norway)

Olympic Games
1932 Winter Olympics
 The 1932 Winter Olympics takes place at Lake Placid
 United States team wins the most medals (12) and the most gold medals (6)
1932 Summer Olympics
 The 1932 Summer Olympics takes place at Los Angeles
 United States team wins the most medals (103) and the most gold medals (41)

Rowing
The Boat Race
 19 March — Cambridge wins the 84th Oxford and Cambridge Boat Race

Rugby league
England
 Championship – St. Helens
 Challenge Cup final – Leeds 11–8 Swinton at Central Park, Wigan
 Lancashire League Championship – St. Helens
 Yorkshire League Championship – Hunslet
 Lancashire County Cup – Salford 10–8 Swinton
 Yorkshire County Cup – Huddersfield 4–2 Hunslet

Australia
 NSW Premiership – South Sydney 19–12 Western Suburbs (Grand Final)

Rugby union
Home Nations Championship
 45th Home Nations Championship series is shared by England, Ireland and Wales

Snooker
World Championship
 6th World Snooker Championship is won by Joe Davis who defeats Clark McConachy 30–19

Speed skating
Speed Skating World Championships
 Men's All-round Champion – Ivar Ballangrud (Norway)
1932 Winter Olympics (Men)
 500m – gold medal: Jack Shea (USA)
 1500m – gold medal: Jack Shea (USA)
 5000m – gold medal: Irving Jaffee (USA)
 10000m – gold medal: Irving Jaffee (USA)
1932 Winter Olympics (Women)
 Women's speed skating is held as a demonstration event only with competitions over 500m, 1000m and 1500m.

Tennis
Australia
 Australian Men's Singles Championship – Jack Crawford (Australia) defeats Harry Hopman (Australia) 4–6, 6–3, 3–6, 6–3, 6–1
 Australian Women's Singles Championship – Coral Buttsworth (Australia) defeats Kathleen Le Messurier (Australia) 9–7, 6–4 
England
 Wimbledon Men's Singles Championship – Ellsworth Vines (USA) defeats Bunny Austin (Great Britain) 6–2, 6–2, 6–0
 Wimbledon Women's Singles Championship – Helen Wills Moody (USA) defeats Helen Jacobs (USA) 6–3, 6–1
France
 French Men's Singles Championship – Henri Cochet (France) defeats Giorgio de Stefani (Italy) 6–0, 6–4, 4–6, 6–3 
 French Women's Singles Championship – Helen Wills Moody (USA) defeats Simonne Mathieu (France) 7–5, 6–1
USA
 American Men's Singles Championship – Ellsworth Vines (USA) defeats Henri Cochet (France) 6–4, 6–4, 6–4
 American Women's Singles Championship – Helen Jacobs (USA) defeats Carolin Babcock Stark (USA) 6–2, 6–2
Davis Cup
 1932 International Lawn Tennis Challenge –  3–2  at Stade Roland Garros (clay) Paris, France

Awards
Associated Press Athlete of the Year
 Associated Press Male Athlete of the Year – Gene Sarazen (golf)
 Associated Press Female Athlete of the Year – Babe Didrikson (athletics)

References

 
Sports by year